Big Machine Records is an American independent record label, distributed by Universal Music Group. Specializing in country and pop artists, Big Machine is based on Music Row in Nashville, Tennessee. The label was founded in September 2005 by former DreamWorks Records executive Scott Borchetta and became a joint venture between Borchetta and country singer Toby Keith. The company concentrates on publishing, management, and merchandising and oversees imprints, such as Valory Music, that are part of the Big Machine Label Group. Taylor Swift was the first client of the label.

History
Big Machine Records was founded by Scott Borchetta, a former punk rock bass guitar player who had worked in the mailroom of his father Mike's music company and eventually became a promotions staff member in 1991 for Universal Music Group's MCA Records. According to Bloomberg Businessweek, Borchetta was an "involved manager" at MCA, "choosing singles and dispensing advice." After he was fired from MCA in 1997, Borchetta accepted a role at the Nashville division of DreamWorks Records, but later decided to start his own label after Universal acquired the division. Before he left DreamWorks, Borchetta approached Taylor Swift and her family after the musician performed at the Bluebird Café in Nashville, Tennessee after first meeting her in 2004. At the time, Borchetta had no infrastructure or financing. He made an offer to Swift and her parents, whereby he would recruit her to the new label's roster after it was established. Swift eventually recontacted Borchetta around two weeks later, telling him: "I'm waiting for you."

He formed the label in 2005, naming it "Big Machine" after a 2004 song by the band Velvet Revolver. The first signees to Big Machine were Jack Ingram and Danielle Peck. Big Machine's first album release was Live: Wherever You Are, a re-release of a live album he had previously issued independently in 2004. In mid-2006, "Wherever You Are" off this album reached number one on Billboard Hot Country Songs, thus becoming the label's first single to top that chart.

Soon after he released Swift's first ever recording, the single "Tim McGraw" and her debut album Taylor Swift. Keith dropped his affiliation with the label in 2006, but he was reported as an equity holder in November 2014, alongside the Swift family and Borchetta (the latter reportedly owned 60 percent of the business at the time). In October 2012, Borchetta told Rolling Stone magazine: "[Taylor Swift's father] Scott Swift owns three percent of Big Machine."

By March 2009, Big Machine artist Danielle Peck had left the label. The departure occurred during a downturn period for the overall U.S. music industry.

In February 2010, Swift won four Grammys—including Album of the Year (Fearless), Best Country Album (Fearless), Best Country Song ("White Horse"), and Best Female Country Vocal Performance ("White Horse")—becoming the first Big Machine artist to win a Grammy Award.

Borchetta signed a deal with Clear Channel—which later changed its name to iHeartMedia—in 2012 that ensures payment for Big Machine artists from terrestrial and digital radio airplay. Three years after the deal was signed, Borchetta said that the revenue streams were "very meaningful."

In response to a claim that Borchetta was seeking a sum of US$200 million for Big Machine since the release of Swift's fifth studio album 1989, the label head refuted the claim in November 2014: "Every time we have a Taylor [Swift] record, they're like, 'Oh, he's selling the company.'" However, Borchetta did not rule out a future change of ownership, stating that "the business is changing so quickly, and if I see a strategic opportunity that's going to be better for our artists and executives, it's going to be a serious conversation." Following the release of 1989, her Big Machine contract required her to produce one more full-length album for the label.

The Zac Brown Band announced on January 12, 2015, that it had finalized a four-way strategic partnership involving the Southern Ground Artists record label, Big Machine Label Group, Republic Records and John Varvatos Records for the release of its fourth studio album. The terms of the deal state that Zac Brown Band will work with Big Machine Label Group for marketing and distribution, while Southern Ground Artists will work on radio promotion, Republic will provide support in the area of non-country radio formats and international promotion, and Varvatos will oversee branding and styling. Borchetta was quoted in the Big Machine press release as saying that there is "literally no ceiling" to what can be achieved by the new partnership, and also spoke of "moments when our best artists hit a global stride and a deeper sense of engagement that speaks a clearer musical language".

In a February 2015 interview, Borchetta refused to comment on the status of the label's distribution deal with Universal Music Group (UMG), which was up for renegotiation at the time. He confirmed that the label would release the next American Idol album, in partnership with 19 Entertainment and UMG—Borchetta would be one of the mentors on the reality program's next series. Borchetta also disclosed that Swift agreed to the withdrawal of her catalog from Spotify after he first suggested the idea to her, and that he would remove the music of all Big Machine artists if it was within his power.

In May 2017, the label branched out into the alcoholic beverage industry by launching Big Machine Vodka, a premium brand distilled in Lynnville, Tennessee. Borchetta described the new venture as "perfectly [complementing] the music we take such great pride in".

In November 2017, Swift released her sixth studio album Reputation, her last album released under Big Machine. After this album, Swift refused to renew her contract with the label. She eventually stayed in Universal Music Group, Big Machine's distributor, and on November 19, 2018, after her contract with Big Machine expired, Swift signed with Republic Records, under a deal in which she would maintain ownership of her masters going forward.

Spotify issue
On November 3, 2014, Swift removed all but one of her songs from Spotify after indications of her disapproval of the streaming service emerged in July of the same year. Swift, statistically one of the world's most popular music artists at the time, had previously delayed the streaming of her 2012 album, Red.

Big Machine country music artists Justin Moore and Brantley Gilbert removed their music from Spotify on November 12, 2014. Like Swift, both artists allowed a single song to remain on the streaming platform.

After Swift and Big Machine withdrew her catalog from Spotify in November 2014, the streaming service launched a social media campaign to persuade Swift to return and, in a statement on its website, claimed that 16 million of over 40 million users had played her music in the preceding 30-day period.

In mid-November, Borchetta disputed figures released by Spotify that claimed that Swift would receive US$6 million annually from the streaming site—Borchetta said in a Time magazine interview that Swift was paid a total of US$500,000 over the previous 12 months. Spotify responded to Borchetta, by clarifying that Swift had been paid US$2 million for global streaming over the year-long time frame. Spotify further explained: "We [Spotify] paid Taylor [Swift]'s label and publisher roughly half a million dollars in the month before she took her catalog down". According to Borchetta, the amount Swift earned from streaming her music videos on the Vevo site was greater than the payout she received from Spotify.

Borchetta then clarified in a February 2015 interview that Swift's catalog would be permitted on a streaming service "that understands the different needs that we [Swift and Big Machine] have," whereby "the choice to be [on the free, ad-supported tier] or not" is provided. Borchetta argued that Swift's musical oeuvre is "arguably the most important current catalog there is" and stated that the streaming issue is "about each individual artist, and the real mission here is to bring ... attention to it."

Taylor Swift's catalog returned to Spotify in June 2017.

Acquisition by Ithaca Holdings 

In October 2018, Big Machine was placed for sale, with bids from Macquarie Group, Evan Spiegel and Universal Music Group. Big Machine was valued at $300 million. On June 30, 2019, Billboard reported that Scooter Braun's Ithaca Holdings had purchased Big Machine Records for $300 million, with funding from Carlyle Group. A few hours after the announcement of the purchase, Taylor Swift wrote on Tumblr that she was unaware of the buyer of the masters of her first six albums. Later that night, Scott Borchetta revealed through the Big Machine Label Group website of his and Swift's conversation regarding the purchase.

A copyright issue arose later in the year just ahead of Swift's American Music Awards' Artist of the Decade performance when Swift tweeted regarding Big Machine's prohibition on the use of her old music.  On August 22, 2019, Swift announced on Good Morning America that she would rerecord her first six albums in November 2020 and release them through Republic Records. On November 16, 2020, Variety reported that Big Machine had sold the rights to Taylor Swift's first six albums to Shamrock Holdings. Swift stated that she had not been contacted about the sale. On February 11, 2021, Swift announced that the first rerecorded song, "Love Story (Taylor's Version)", would be released the following day at midnight, which was then followed by the album Fearless (Taylor's Version) on April 9. Swift announced the next re-recorded album to be released, originally slated for a November 19 release then changed to a November 12 release date, would be Red (Taylor's Version), on June 18.

Acquisition by Hybe Corporation 
On April 2, 2021, it was announced that Ithaca Holdings, including Big Machine, would be sold to the South Korean music and entertainment firm Hybe Corporation (formerly Big Hit Entertainment). Borchetta will remain CEO of Big Machine.

Imprints

Valory Music Co.
In November 2007, Big Machine Records founded a subsidiary imprint called Valory Music Co. Acts signed to this roster include Jimmy Wayne (who was formerly signed to Big Machine), Jewel, The Mavericks, Thomas Rhett, and Justin Moore.

By the end of November 2008, the Valory imprint entered into a partnership with Midas Records—promotion, sales, marketing, production, publicity and distribution—for Canadian acts Adam Gregory and Emerson Drive. The announcement that Reba McEntire would join Valory was also publicized in November 2008. McEntire's debut single on Valory was scheduled for 2009, with her new studio album scheduled for mid-2009.

BMLG Records
Big Machine joined with Universal Republic Records in June 2009 to found a new label, Republic Nashville. 
In August 2016, Republic Nashville was rebranded as BMLG Records after Big Machine took back full ownership of the label.

Dot Records
In March 2014, Big Machine announced the revival of Dot Records and, as of February 2015, the imprint was run in partnership with Republic Records. Dot was shuttered in March 2017 and a number of its artists moved to other Big Machine imprints.

Nash Icon Records
In 2014, Big Machine announced a partnership with Cumulus Media to create Nash Icon Music, a Big Machine imprint serving as an offshoot of Cumulus's Nash FM brand, focusing on active country acts who achieved mainstream fame in the 1990s and early 2000s. Cumulus also operates Nash Icon-branded radio stations with a similar focus.

On October 21, 2014, it was announced that McEntire would be the first artist signed to Nash Icon Music. Nash Icon Records folded into Big Machine Records in 2018.

Notable artists

Current country artists
Danielle Bradbery (returned to Big Machine in 2020)
Kristian Bush
The Cadillac Three
Callista Clark
Jay DeMarcus
Jackson Dean
Ray Wylie Hubbard
Brian Kelley
Gary LeVox
Tim McGraw 
Midland
Carly Pearce
Sugarland

Former country artists

Tucker Beathard
Garth Brooks (Big Machine/Pearl)
Dusty Drake
Edens Edge
Adam Gregory (Big Machine/Midas/Open Road)
Trent Harmon
Jack Ingram
Lauren Jenkins
Kate & Kacey
Reba McEntire
Todd O'Neill (Nash Next)
Danielle Peck
Melissa Peterman (Comedy Artist)
Rascal Flatts (disbanded, LeVox and DeMarcus remain signed individually)
Payton Smith
Steel Magnolia
Jennifer Nettles
Noah Schnacky
Sunny Sweeney (moved to Republic)
Taylor Swift (moved to Republic)  
Waterloo Revival
Jimmy Wayne (moved to Valory)
Trisha Yearwood

Former Nash Icon Records artists

Reba McEntire (moved to Big Machine)
Ronnie Dunn (moved to Big Machine)
Martina McBride
Hank Williams Jr

BMLG Records roster

Riley Green
Chris Janson
Lady A
Shane Profitt
Brett Young

Former artists

Danielle Bradbery (moved back to Big Machine in 2020)
The Band Perry
Greg Bates
Laci Kaye Booth
Eli Young Band (moved to Valory)
Fast Ryde
Florida Georgia Line
Ryan Follese
Jaron and the Long Road to Love
Jackie Lee
Martina McBride (moved to Nash Icon)
Cassadee Pope
SHEL
Dallas Smith
Sunny Sweeney
A Thousand Horses
Drake White

Former Dot Records artists

Tucker Beathard (moved to Big Machine)
Craig Wayne Boyd
Ashley Campbell
Aaron Lewis (moved to Valory)
Maddie & Tae 
Carly Pearce (moved to Big Machine)
Drake White (moved to BMLG)
Steven Tyler
The Shires
Zac Brown Band (Southern Ground Artist's/Republic Records/John Varvatos Records)

Valory Music Co. roster
Sheryl Crow
Eli Young Band
Brantley Gilbert
Aaron Lewis
Justin Moore
Thomas Rhett
Tyler Rich
Conner Smith

Former artists

Delta Rae
Emerson Drive (Valory/Midas/Open Road)
Jewel
The Mavericks
Reba McEntire (moved to Nash Icon)
RaeLynn
Jimmy Wayne

Big Machine/John Varvatos Records
Badflower (Big Machine/John Varvatos Records)
Ayron Jones (Big Machine/John Varvatos Records)
The Struts

Former pop artists

MacKenzie Bourg
Cheap Trick
Nick Fradiani
Gunnar Gehl
Laura Marano
La'Porsha Renae (Big Machine/Motown Records)
Who Is Fancy

See also
 Big Machine Racing
 List of record labels

References

External links
 Big Machine Records

American country music record labels
American independent record labels
Record labels established in 2005
Country music record labels
Pop record labels
Soundtrack record labels
Labels distributed by Universal Music Group
Record labels based in Tennessee
American subsidiaries of foreign companies